Foster Avenue (5200 N) is a major east-west street on the North Side of Chicago as well as the northwestern suburbs. Foster Avenue separates the Chicago lakefront neighborhoods of Edgewater to the north and Uptown to the south.

Foster Avenue runs in Chicago from Lake Michigan on the east to East River Road (8800 W.) to the west and picks up again west of Des Plaines River Road to connect Chicago to O'Hare Airport. It carries U.S. Route 41 from Lake Shore Drive to Lincoln Avenue.

It is named for early Chicago settler John H. Foster.

Major neighborhoods
Edgewater
North Park
Forest Glen
Jefferson Park
Norwood Park
O'Hare

Transportation
The CTA provides bus service via the 92 Foster bus between Broadway and Milwaukee Avenue. The 50 Damen, 93 California/Dodge, 136 Sheridan/LaSalle Express, 146 Inner Drive/Michigan Express and 147 Outer Drive Express serve the road for short segments.

References

Streets in Chicago
U.S. Route 41